Pawling  may refer to:

Pawling (town), New York,  in Dutchess County
Pawling (village), New York, in the town of Pawling
Pawling (Metro-North station), train station for the village
Pawling Nature Reserve, in the northern section of the town of Pawling
Pawling Hall, a historic meeting hall in Hagaman, Montgomery County, New York, United States
Pawling & Harnischfeger, a United States mining-equipment manufacturer in Wisconsin, 1880s–1930s

See also
Pauling (surname)